Rose Mary Robinson (born December 12, 1939) is an American lawyer and a former Democratic member of the Michigan House of Representatives.

Early life and education

Rose Mary Robinson was born on December 12, 1939. In 1972, Robinson earned a Juris Doctor degree from Wayne State Law School in Detroit, Michigan.

Career 
Robinson started her legal career as a Legal Council for American Federation of State, County, and Municipal Employees for Council 25. In 1970, with the help from John Dingell, Robinson was one of the first women elected as a County Commissioner in Wayne County, Michigan. Robinson served as the County Commissioner until 1982. In 2006, 2008, and 2010, Robinson was a delegate for the Democratic Precinct.

On November 6, 2012, Robinson won the election and became a member of the Michigan House of Representatives for District 4 and won reelection two more times being term limits prevented her from seeking another. In February 2015, Robinson cosponsored HB 4209, a bill that establishes regulations for medical marijuana facilities. In September 2017, Robinson cosponsored HB 4991, a bill that appropriates $1.3 billion for fiscal year 2019. Due to term limits, Robinson did not campaign in the 2018 election.

References

External links 
 Rose Mary Robinson at ballotpedia.org
 Rose Mary Robinson links at housedems.com
 Rose Mary Robinson at legislature.mi.gov
 Bill 2015-HR-4229(HTML format)
 Rose Mary Robinson at arc-detroit.org
 Rose Mary Robinson at politicalgraveyard.com

1939 births
21st-century American politicians
21st-century American women politicians
County commissioners in Michigan
Living people
Democratic Party members of the Michigan House of Representatives
Michigan lawyers
Place of birth missing (living people)
Politicians from Detroit
Wayne State University Law School alumni
Women state legislators in Michigan